Petrus Van Theemsche (15 August 1915 – 28 May 1999) was a Belgian racing cyclist. He won the Belgian national road race title in 1938.

References

External links

1915 births
1999 deaths
Belgian male cyclists
People from Lokeren
Cyclists from East Flanders